The Ministry of Stories is a non-profit organisation in East London dedicated to helping children and young adults develop writing skills and to helping teachers inspire their students to write.

Overview
Located in Hoxton, a district in the London Borough of Hackney, England, The Ministry of Stories was founded in 2010 by the British author Nick Hornby and co-directors Lucy Macnab and Ben Payne. The company provides mentoring and advice to young writers, relying on the work of volunteer writers, teachers and artists. The MoS aims to inspire young people to transform their lives through creative writing. The company works closely with schools, supporting teachers, but also provides one-to-one mentoring for young people to enjoy imaginative stories, improve language skills, increase abilities in communication, and develop social and educational confidence.

As of late 2012, 5,000 young people have taken part in activities sponsored by the MoS. About 500 trained volunteers have contributed to the effort, as have writers including Joe Dunthorne, David Nicholls and Zadie Smith, as well as actors Colin Firth and Emma Thompson.

The MoS is patterned after Dave Eggers' 826 Valencia, founded in 2002 in San Francisco, and Roddy Doyle's Fighting Words, founded in 2009 in Dublin.

The MoS receives funding from the Arts Council England.

Hoxton Street Monster Supplies

The MoS is located behind its Hoxton Street Monster Supplies, a sweets and oddities shop selling Fang Floss, jars of Human Snot and cans marked Creeping Dread and Escalating Panic.

References

External links 
Ministry of Stories official website
Hoxton Street Monster Supplies official website 

Creative writing programs
2010 in London
2010 establishments in England